Below is a list of Grand Marshals of the Rose Parade. This is an honorary position selected by the president of the Pasadena Tournament of Roses Association. Many marshals are picked for a relationship to the theme that is also picked by the president. Traditionally, the Grand Marshal of the Rose Parade also participates in the coin toss during the Rose Bowl Game.

History

The 2022 Rose Parade and Rose Bowl game was led by Grand Marshal LeVar Burton, while 2023's event will be led by former congresswoman Gabrielle Giffords.

2020 featured three Grand Marshals: legendary Oscar, Emmy, Grammy and Tony Award-winning actress and singer Rita Moreno, Olympic gymnast Laurie Hernández & Firefly star Gina Torres. However, the next year no Rose Parade was held due to the ongoing COVID pandemic. It marked the first time such a thing happened in 130 years.

Ten-time Grammy Award winner Chaka Khan was chosen by Tournament of Roses Association president Gerald Freeny as the Grand Marshal for the 2019 Rose Parade and Rose Bowl Game.

Actor and humanitarian Gary Sinise was chosen as the 2018 Tournament of Roses Grand Marshal by its president Lance Tibbet on October 30, 2017. Sinise is known for playing the role of Lt. Dan Taylor in Forrest Gump.

The Disney family is the only family to have more than one member serve as Grand Marshal: Walt Disney was the 1966 Grand Marshal, then his nephew Roy E. Disney held the post in 2000. Additionally, Mickey Mouse was the grand marshal for the 2005 parade. A number of years have featured multiple grand marshals, with the most in one parade being 1952, when seven Medal of Honor recipients were the grand marshals. Dr. Francis F. Rowland has been the grand marshal more than any other person - a total of seven times, in 1890, 1892, 1894, 1904, 1905, 1910 (this year sharing this duty with Prof. Charles F. Holder), and 1916. Former child actress Shirley Temple Black holds the runner-up position, having been grand marshal three times in 1939, 1989 and 1999, the latter year where she shared this honor with astronaut Buzz Aldrin, baseball player Jackie Robinson (who was also the first ever posthumous grand marshal) and film producer David L. Wolper.

On May 9, 2014, Louis Zamperini was selected as the Grand Marshal for the 2015 Tournament of Roses Parade, though he died of pneumonia two months later, and six months before the parade was set to begin. Rather than select a new Grand Marshal, the Tournament announced that it was "committed to honoring him as the Grand Marshal of the 2015 Rose Parade," making him the first posthumous grand marshal since Jackie Robinson in 1999.  At the parade, the formal honour was given to son Luke Zamperini (with his wife Lisa son Clay) and daughter Cynthia Garris (with her husband Mike).

On November 3, 2016, the 2017 Grand Marshals were revealed to be three Olympic athletes: Greg Louganis, Janet Evans and Allyson Felix. The Olympians were deliberately chosen to reflect on Los Angeles' bid for the 2024 Summer Olympics. This was the first year with multiple Grand Marshals since 2003, when Bill Cosby, Art Linkletter and Fred Rogers all shared this duty.

1890s

 1890 - Dr. Francis F. Rowland
 1891 - NONE
 1892 - Dr. Francis F. Rowland
 1893 - no Grand Marshal
 1894 - Dr. Francis F. Rowland
 1895 - Dr. Henry H. Sherk
 1896 & 1897 - Edwin Stearns
 1898 & 1899 - Martin H. Weight

1900s

 1900 & 1901 - Charles Daggett
 1902 & 1903 - C. C. Reynolds
 1904 & 1905 - Francis F. Rowland
 1906 - John B. Miller
 1907 & 1908 - Dr. Ralph Skillen
 1909 - Walter S. Wright

1910s

 1910 - Dr. Francis F. Rowland & Prof. Charles F. Holder
 1911 - Dr. Ralph Skillen
 1912 - E. H. Groenendyke
 1913 - Leigh Guyer
 1914 - Charles Daggett
 1915 - M. S. Pashgian
 1916 - Dr. Francis F. Rowland
 1917 - Dr. C. D. Lockwood
 1918 - Dr. Z. T. Malaby
 1919 - Frank Hunter

1920s

 1920 - Frank G. Hogan
 1921 - W. A. Boucher
 1922 - Harold Landreth
 1923 - H.L. Gianetti
 1924 - Col. George S. Parker
 1925 - Lewis H. Turner
 1926 - Col. L. J. Mygatt
 1927 - Dr. C.D. Lockwood
 1928 - John McDonald
 1929 - Marco Hellman

1930s

 1930 - James Rolph
 1931 - Gen. Charles S. Farnsworth
 1932 - William May Garland
 1933 - Mary Pickford
 1934 - Adm. William Sims
 1935 - Harold Lloyd
 1936 - James V. Allred
 1937 - Eugene Biscailuz
 1938 - Leo Carrillo
 1939 - Shirley Temple

1940s

 1940 - Edgar Bergen & Charlie McCarthy
 1941 - E. O. Nay
 1942 - Kay Kyser
 1943 - Governor-elect Earl Warren 
 1944 - Amos Alonzo Stagg
 1945 - Former President Herbert Hoover
 1946 - Adm. William Halsey
 1947 - Bob Hope
 1948 - Gen. Omar Bradley
 1949 - Perry Brown

1950s

 1950 - Paul G. Hoffman
 1951 - Corporal Robert S. Gray (For General Dwight D. Eisenhower)
 1952 - Medal of Honor Men: Major Carl Sitter, Captain Lewis Millett, Lieutenant Stanley Adams, Lieutenant Thomas Hudner, Captain Raymond Harvey, Sergeant Ernest Kouma & Sergeant Joseph C. Rodriguez
 1953 - Senator and Vice President-elect Richard M. Nixon 
 1954 - General William F. Dean
 1955 - Chief Justice Earl Warren
 1956 - Charles E. Wilson
 1957 - Eddie Rickenbacker
 1958 - Robert Gordon Sproul
 1959 - E. L. "Bob" Bartlett

1960s

 1960 - Vice President Richard M. Nixon
 1961 - William F. Quinn
 1962 - Albert D. Rosellini
 1963 - Dr. William H. Pickering
 1964 - Former President Dwight D. Eisenhower 
 1965 - Arnold Palmer
 1966 - Walt Disney
 1967 - Thanat Khoman
 1968 - Senator Everett Dirksen
 1969 - Bob Hope

1970s

 1970 - Apollo 12 Astronauts: Alan L. Bean, Charles Conrad Jr. & Richard F. Gordon Jr.
 1971 - Reverend Billy Graham
 1972 - Lawrence Welk
 1973 - John Wayne
 1974 - Charles M. Schulz
 1975 - Hank Aaron
 1976 - Kate Smith
 1977 - Roy Rogers & Dale Evans
 1978 - Former President Gerald Ford
 1979 - Lathrop K. Leishman

1980s

 1980 - Frank Sinatra
 1981 - Lorne Greene
 1982 - James Stewart
 1983 - Merlin Olsen
 1984 - Danny Kaye
 1985 - Lee A. Iacocca
 1986 - Erma Bombeck
 1987 - Pelé
 1988 - Gregory Peck
 1989 - Shirley Temple Black

1990s

 1990 - Senator John Glenn
 1991 - Bob Newhart
 1992 - The Most Excellent Cristóbal Colón de Carvajal y Gorosábel, 18th Duke of Veragua (descendant of Christopher Columbus) & Congressman Ben Nighthorse Campbell
 1993 - Angela Lansbury
 1994 - William Shatner
 1995 - Juan "Chi-Chi" Rodríguez
 1996 - Kermit the Frog
 1997 - Carl Lewis & Shannon Miller
 1998 - Carol Burnett
 1999 - Buzz Aldrin, Shirley Temple Black, Jackie Robinson (posthumous) & David L. Wolper

2000s

 2000 - Roy E. Disney
 2001 - Tom Brokaw
 2002 - Regis Philbin
 2003 - Bill Cosby, Art Linkletter & Fred Rogers
 2004 - John Williams
 2005 - Mickey Mouse
 2006 - Justice Sandra Day O'Connor
 2007 - George Lucas
 2008 - Emeril Lagasse
 2009 - Cloris Leachman

2010s

 2010 - Chesley B. "Sully" Sullenberger III
 2011 - Paula Deen
 2012 - J. R. Martinez
 2013 - Jane Goodall
 2014 - Vin Scully
 2015 – Louis Zamperini (represented by his family after his death)
 2016 – Ken Burns
 2017 – Greg Louganis, Janet Evans and Allyson Felix
 2018 – Gary Sinise
2019 – Chaka Khan

2020s

2020 – Laurie Hernández, Rita Moreno & Gina Torres
2021 – NONE (Parade cancelled by COVID-19 pandemic)
2022 – LeVar Burton 
2023 – Gabby Giffords

Gallery of Recent Grand Marshals

References

Tournament of Roses